Robinsonekspedisjonen: 2009, was the ninth season of the Norwegian version of the Swedish show Expedition Robinson and it premiered on 6 September 2009 and aired until 6 December 2009. The major twist this season was that of Team X, a team of contestants that had previously been eliminated. The formation of Team X started with a fake elimination of two players in a challenge in episode one. Two more players were fake eliminated in episode one when both tribe leaders were told that they had to choose one member of their tribe to eliminate. In episode 3, Peder was fake eliminated in a duel against Kristoffer. Following the duel Kristoffer swapped tribes. The final two members of Team X joined when in episode 4 Team X competed in a challenge against North team and South team. North team finished last in the challenge and as a result was eliminated, however, Team X was told that they could save one member of the North team from elimination. Team X chose to save Iris, which meant that she then became part of Team X. Severin also became part of Team X as the North team decided to give him immunity before the challenge. From episode 5 until the merge, South team and Team X competed in challenges against each other. Following the merge, Peder was ejected from the game for faking an injury. As the game progressed, the original South team members began to pick off what was left of Team X until only South team members remained in the game. Like the season that preceded it, this season had a final three instead of a final four. The last three players faced off in two challenges in order to determine the finalists. Ultimately, it was Lina Iversen who won the season over Christian Flotvik with a jury vote of 5-2.

Finishing order

The game

:  In a twist, Espen, the person who initially received the most votes, was the only person allowed to vote at tribal council.
:  As North Team had lost both immunity challenges, the entire team was eliminated. For losing the first of the two challenges, Team X had to go tribal council.
:  Following Tommy‘s withdraw from the game, Marita re-entered in his place.
:  As Marte and Peder each received three votes, they had to compete in a dule to determine who would stay.
:  Francois came last in the immunity challenge and lost his right to vote.

:  Pål came last in the immunity challenge and lost his right to vote.

:  Katherine came last in the immunity challenge and lost her right to vote.
:  The contestants were voting for two players that they wanted to stay in the game. As Pål and Katherine each received zero votes, they faced off in a duel in order to determine who would stay.
:  Kristoffer won an extra vote after winning the duel against Severin.
:  The final three contestants competed in two challenges in order to determine the final two.

Voting history

 In a twist, at the third tribal council the person who initially received the most votes would then vote to eliminate a player.

 As the North Team lost both immunity challenges, the entire team was eliminated with the exception of Iris and Severin.

 Following Tommy's voluntary exit, Marita was allowed to return to the game.

 Peder was ejected for faking an injury.

 Francois came in last at the immunity challenge and lost his right to vote.

 Pål came last in the immunity challenge and lost his right to vote.

 Severin came last in the immunity challenge and lost his right to vote.

 Each contestant voted for the two people or one person(worth two votes) that they wanted to keep in the game.

 Katherine came last in the immunity challenge and lost her right to vote.

 Kristoffer won a second vote following his victory against Severin in the duel.

External links
http://www.vg.no
http://www.worldofbigbrother.com

 2009
2009 Norwegian television seasons